The 1997 Suwon Samsung Bluewings season was Suwon Samsung Bluewings's second season in the K-League in Republic of Korea. Suwon Samsung Bluewings is competing in K-League, League Cup and Korean FA Cup.

Squad

Backroom Staff

Coaching Staff

Honours

Club

Individual
K-League Top Assistor:  Denis (6 assists)
K-League Cup Top Assistor:  Ko Jong-Soo (4 assists)
K-League Best XI:  Lee Jin-Haeng

References

External links
 Suwon Bluewings Official website

Suwon Samsung Bluewings seasons
Suwon Samsung Bluewings